Richard Mauch (born September 2, 1874, in Weidling, † May 25, 1921 in Dietramszell ) was an Austrian painter and illustrator. He was a member of the Munich Secession.

At first Mauch worked primarily as a portrait and genre painter in the conservative style of the Munich School. However, around 1900 he joined the Munich Secession, which paved the way for Art Nouveau. On April 30, 1904, he became a member of the Vienna Künstlerhaus.

Since the turn of the 20th century, Mauch's works took on a symbolic, often erotic character. The knight's dream created in 1902 is an example of this tendency. In 1909 Mauch moved to Munich and continued his studies at the Munich Academy. He took part in the exhibitions of the Luitpold group.

Mauch also worked as a graphic artist and illustrator, notably for the prominent weekly magazine ‘Fliegende Blätter’.

His works are in various German and Austrian museums, including the Städtische Galerie im Lenbachhaus and the Münchner Stadtmuseum.

References

Literature and source 

 Stephen Farthing: 1001 Must-See Paintings . Librero, 2012. ISBN 978-90-8998-209-4

External links 

 ( en ) Mauch on AskArt  https://www.askart.com/artist/artist/11052924/artist.aspx
 General lexicon of fine artists from antiquity to the present . Founded by Ulrich Thieme and Felix Becker . tape24: Mandere–Möhl. E. A. Seemann, Leipzig 1930, S.272.

Gallery 

1874 births
1921 deaths